Zinc finger protein 41 is a protein that in humans is encoded by the ZNF41 gene.

This gene product is a likely zinc finger family transcription factor. It contains KRAB-A and KRAB-B domains that act as transcriptional repressors in related proteins, and multiple zinc finger DNA binding motifs and finger linking regions characteristic of the Kruppel family. This gene is part of a gene cluster on chromosome Xp11.23. Several alternatively spliced transcript variants have been described, however, the full-length nature of only some of them is known.

References

Further reading

External links 
 

Transcription factors